The men's discus throw at the 2017 World Para Athletics Championships was held at the Olympic Stadium in London from 14 to 23 July.

Medalists

Events listed in pink were contested but no medals were awarded.

See also
List of IPC world records in athletics

References

discus throw
Discus throw at the World Para Athletics Championships